Peter Mally (born 19 October 1958) is an Italian alpine skiing coach and former alpine skier who finished 7th in slalom at the 1982 World Championships.

World Cup results
Top 10

World Championship results

References

External links
 

1958 births
Living people
Italian male alpine skiers
Germanophone Italian people
Sportspeople from Merano
Italian alpine skiing coaches